Pigford House was a historic home located near Clinton, Sampson County, North Carolina.   It was built about 1850, and was a one-story, single-pile, vernacular Greek Revival style frame dwelling.  It was sheathed with board-and-batten siding, had a classically inspired center gable porch, and a rear two-roam ell with a later weatherboard addition. It has been demolished.

It was added to the National Register of Historic Places in 1986.

References

Houses on the National Register of Historic Places in North Carolina
Greek Revival houses in North Carolina
Houses completed in 1850
Houses in Sampson County, North Carolina
National Register of Historic Places in Sampson County, North Carolina